Paul Lagarde (born 15 April 1891 - 7 February 1964)  was a French pole vaulter. He competed at the 1920 Summer Olympics and finished 11th.

References

1891 births
Date of death unknown
French male pole vaulters
Athletes (track and field) at the 1920 Summer Olympics
Olympic athletes of France